Lt. James Young Milne Henderson (9 March 1891 – 31 July 1917) was a Scottish rugby union player and British Army officer who was killed in World War I.

Rugby Union career

Amateur career

He was educated at George Watson's College and played for the Watsonian RFC. A diverse athlete, he also played cricket, field hockey and was a champion swimmer as well, winning the East of Scotland swimming championship.

He moved to Travancore, India for business. There he played for Madras Rugby Club.

Provincial career

He played for the Blues Trial side against the Whites Trial side on 21 January 1911, while still with Watsonians.

International career

He had one cap for  against  in 1911.

Business career

Milne Henderson was a works manager for the Scottish food company McVitie and Price.

Military career

He served in the Highland Light Infantry and was mentioned in despatches by Field Marshal the Earl Haig. He was killed in the Third Battle of Ypres in July 1917. He is commemorated at the Menin Gate Ypres Memorial.

Family

Milne Henderson was born James Young Henderson in Edinburgh to John, a chartered accountant and bank manager, and Edwardina "Ina" Young Henderson. (The family added the Milne to their surname a few years after he was born.) He had four brothers and one sister.

His younger brother 2nd Lt. John Milne Henderson of the Royal Flying Corps was killed six months later in France. Their oldest brother was Royal Navy Commodore Thomas Milne Henderson  (1888–1968).

References

External links
 "An entire team wiped out by the Great War".  The Scotsman, 6 November 2009

1891 births
1917 deaths
Rugby union players from Edinburgh
Scottish rugby union players
Scotland international rugby union players
British military personnel killed in World War I
Blues Trial players
Watsonians RFC players
Rugby union fly-halves